Bower's white-toothed rat (Berylmys bowersi) is a species of rodent in the family Muridae native to southeast Asia.

Distribution and habitat
The species is found in China, India, Indonesia, Laos, Malaysia, Myanmar, Thailand, and Vietnam. It occurs in a wide variety of habitats, including plantations, subtropical and montane forests, cultivated fields, shrubland, and disturbed forests. While patchily distributed, it is common and locally abundant.

References

Berylmys
Rats of Asia
Rodents of Southeast Asia
Rodents of China
Rodents of India
Rodents of Indonesia
Rodents of Myanmar
Rodents of Thailand
Rodents of Vietnam
Mammals described in 1879
Taxonomy articles created by Polbot